The following are notable jazz fusion performers or bands.

For performers of smooth jazz, a more radio-friendly, pop-infused variant of fusion, see List of smooth jazz performers.

Bassists 
 Steve Bailey
 Victor Bailey
 Jeff Berlin
 Richard Bona
 Brian Bromberg
 Jack Bruce (1943–2014)
 Bunny Brunel
 Tony Bunn (born 1957)
 Alain Caron
 Stanley Clarke
 Jimmy Earl
 Mark Egan
 Brent Fischer
 Jimmy Haslip
 Anthony Jackson
 Paul Jackson
 Alphonso Johnson
 Percy Jones
 Abraham Laboriel
 Tim Landers
 Dave LaRue
 Marcus Miller
 John Myung
 Teruo Nakamura
 Jaco Pastorius (1951–1987)
 John Patitucci
 Tetsuo Sakurai
 Sandra Riley Tang
 Jannick Top
 Miroslav Vitouš
 Oytun Ersan
 Tal Wilkenfeld
 Gary Willis
 Victor Wooten

Drummers and Percussionists 
 Dennis Chambers
 Billy Cobham
 Bill Bruford
 Chad Szeliga
 Jonathan Chua
 Vinnie Colaiuta
 Kirk Covington
 Jack DeJohnette
 Joe DeRenzo
 Virgil Donati
 Peter Erskine
 Danny Gottlieb
 Trilok Gurtu
 Omar Hakim
 Bob Holz
 Gary Husband
 Akira Jimbo
 Narelle Kheng
 Harvey Mason
 Marilyn Mazur
 Mitch Mitchell (1947–2008)
 Airto Moreira
 Alphonse Mouzon
 Simon Phillips
 Gar Samuelson (1958–1999)
 Steve Smith
 Christian Vander
 Chad Wackerman
 Dave Weckl
 Lenny White
 Tony Williams (1945–1997)
 Robert Wyatt
 Gerry Zaragemca (born 1954)

Guitarists 
 John Abercrombie
 Masahiro Andoh
Gustavo Assis-Brasil
 Jennifer Batten
 Jeff Beck
 Walter Becker
 Tommy Bolin (1951–1976)
 Hiram Bullock
 Larry Carlton
 Bill Connors
 Larry Coryell
 Torsten de Winkel
 Daniel Deaguero
 Al Di Meola
 Orhan Demir
 Barry Finnerty
 Robben Ford
 Russ Freeman
 Bill Frisell
 Frank Gambale
 John Goodsall
 Guthrie Govan
 Nathan Hartono
 Scott Henderson
 Allan Holdsworth
 Greg Howe
 Brian Hughes
 Ryo Kawasaki
 Gideon King
 Kaki King (primarily an acoustic rock artist with significant jazz fusion recordings)
 Steve Khan
 Benjamin Kheng
 Wayne Krantz
 Shawn Lane (1963–2003)
 Kiko Loureiro
 Steve Lukather
 Tony MacAlpine
 Alex Machacek
 John McLaughlin
 Pat Metheny
 Mike Miller
 Gary Moore
 Steve Morse
 Issei Noro
 Chris Poland
 Lee Ritenour
 Terje Rypdal
 John Scofield
 Peter Sprague
 Mike Stern
 Daryl Stuermer
 Andy Summers
 David Torn
 Kazumi Watanabe
 Frank Zappa (1940–1993)

Keyboardists 
 Brian Auger
 Louis Banks
 Chick Corea
 Tom Coster
 Eumir Deodato
 George Duke
 Donald Fagen
 Russell Ferrante
 Clare Fischer
 Mitchel Forman
 Jan Hammer
 Herbie Hancock
 Adam Holzman
 Steve Hunt
 Bob James
 Keith Jarrett
 Scott Kinsey
 Kenny Kirkland (1955–1998)
 Simon Kiselicki
 Jeff Lorber
 Lyle Mays
 Barry Miles
 Patrick Moraz
 Mike Ratledge
 Vladislav Sendecki
 Derek Sherinian
 Ruslan Sirota
 Dave Stewart
 Hiromi Uehara
 Steve Weingart
 Joe Zawinul (1932–2007)
 Minoru Mukaiya
 John Novello

Saxophonists 
 Gato Barbieri (1932–2016)
 Michael Brecker (1949–2007)
 Elton Dean (1945–2006)
 Joe Farrell (1937–1986)
 Kenny Garrett
 Steve Grossman
 Joe Henderson (1937–2001)
 Ron Holloway
 Dave Liebman
 Bennie Maupin
 Bob Mintzer
 Chris Potter
 Tom Scott
 Wayne Shorter
 Dave Sanborn
 Grover Washington Jr
 Sadao Watanabe
 Kenny G

Trumpeters and Flugelhornists 
 Randy Brecker
 Bill Chase (1934–1974)
 Miles Davis (1926–1991)
 Freddie Hubbard (1938–2008)
 Nicholas Payton
 Don Ellis (1934–1978)

Other Instruments 
 Kinan Azmeh (clarinet)
 Gary Burton (vibraphone)
 Béla Fleck (banjo)
 Jerry Goodman (violin)
 Didier Lockwood (violin)
 Mike Mainieri (vibraphone)
 Jean-Luc Ponty (violin)
 Julian Priester (trombone)
 Zbigniew Seifert (violin)
 Jeremy Steig (flute)
 Michał Urbaniak (violin)

Bands 

 Aghora
 Animals as Leaders
 Animal Logic
 Arcana
 Area
 Atheist
 Ayers Rock
 Azteca
 Ginger Baker's Air Force
 Backwater
 Blackbyrds
 Blood Sweat & Tears
 Brand X
 Bruford
 BWB
 CAB
 Caldera
 Casiopea
 Centipede
 Colosseum
 Colosseum II
 Chicago
 Chick Corea Elektric Band
 Chon
 Cozzetti & Gemmill
 The Crusaders
 Cynic
 Citizen Swing
 Dave Matthews Band
 Den Za Den
 Dirty Loops
 Dixie Dregs
 Dreams
 Earth Wind and Fire
 Elements
 Ephel Duath
 Farmers Market
 Fattburger
 Fermata
 Finnforest
 Béla Fleck and the Flecktones
 Free Moral Agents
 Galactic
 Gamalon
 Gilgamesh
Gong
 Gorguts
 Gamalon
 Garaj Mahal
 Gutbucket
 Hatfield and the North
 The Headhunters
 The Heliocentrics
 Henry Cow
 Hiroshima
 Haiku (George Puleo's Trio )
 Ian Gillan Band
 Iceberg (Spanish guitar player Max Sune's late band )
 If
 Into The Moat
 Isis
 Isotope
 Jaga Jazzist
 Jazz Is Dead
 Jazz Q
 Jimmy Chamberlin Complex
 Journey (1973–1977 only)
 Kayo Dot
 Kneebody
 Kostarev Group
 Kraan
 Koinonia (band)
 Leb i Sol
 Lighthouse (band)
 Liquid Tension Experiment
 Mahavishnu Orchestra
 Maneige
 Manfred Mann's Earth Band
 Manfred Mann Chapter Three
 Manteca
 Mark-Almond
 Marbin
 Matching Mole
 Medeski Martin & Wood
 Stimela
 Smak
 Mezzoforte
 National Health
 Niacin
 Nucleus
 Neal Schon
 Opafire (musical project)
 Oregon
 Ozric Tentacles
 OHM
 OHMphrey (made up of musicians from both OHM and Umphrey's McGee)
 Pages
 Passport
 Perigeo
 Phish
 Physical Therapy
 Pierre Moerlen's Gong
 Planet X
 Return to Forever
 Rippingtons
 The Sam Willows
 Santana
 SBB
 September
 Shakatak
 Shakti
 The Shuffle Demons
 Skaldowie
 The Slip
 Snarky Puppy
 Soft Machine
 Solstice
 Spyro Gyra
 Steely Dan
 Steps Ahead (Mike Mainieri's fusion band )
 T-Square
 Tako
 Ten Wheel Drive
 Thank You Scientist
 The Aristocrats (band)
 The Number Twelve Looks Like You
 The Tony Williams Lifetime
 Traffic
 Tribal Tech
 Tryphon (French bassplayer Gille Coqueard's late band )
 United Jazz and Rock Ensemble (feat drummer John Hiseman of Colosseum )
 Uzeb
 Ultramarine (Nguyen Le late French fusion band )
 Vital Information
 Vital Tech Tones
 War
 Weather Report
 Yellowjackets

References 

Fusion